The Jumeirah Lakes Towers (JLT) is a large development in Dubai, United Arab Emirates which consists of 80 towers being constructed along the edges of three artificial lakes (Lake Almas West, Lake Almas East, JLT Lake) as well as the JLT Embankment of eight towers facing Jumeirah Islands. Initially JLT had four lakes (Lake Almas West, Lake Almas East, Lake Elucio, Lake Allure), in late 2012 developer (DMCC) announced that lake Elucio would be drained and  park would be created instead. Subsequently, Lake Allure has been renamed to JLT Lake. The total area covered by the lakes, waterways and landscaping will be . The towers will range from having 35 floors to having 45, except for the centerpiece (Almas Tower), which is 66 floors. The tallest tower and the centerpiece of the entire complex is Almas Tower which is situated on its own island between Lake Almas West and Lake Almas East.

The completion of Saba Tower in December 2006 marked the first tower to be completed in Jumeirah Lakes Towers. The majority of construction took place in 2008. By April 2011, over 80 percent of the towers in JLT was claimed to have been completed. As of June 2015 there were reported to still be 11 towers being either left undone due to the 2009 crisis or still undergoing construction in JLT. The most prominent of these are Wind Tower 1 and Wind Tower 2 that are part of Cluster B and right on Shk. Zayed Road - they are under construction since more than 12 years.

Clusters
The towers in JLT proper are organized in 26 clusters of three named from A to Z, each cluster has its own parking structure and a retail waterfront.

List of towers

Population and facilities
The project is estimated to have a resident population of around 60,000 and a working population of another 120,000; it will include five children's playgrounds, three mosques, a  park (reshaped from Lake Elucio in 2013–2014), a police station, a civil defense station, a hospital and other facilities.

There are two available Dubai metro stations along the site: Sobha Realty (previously Dubai Marina) and DMCC (previously Jumeirah Lakes Towers) stations.

Fires
On January 18, 2007, two workers were killed and at least 40 injured when a fire broke out in the Fortune Tower, which was under construction at the time.  The Fortune Tower's construction was delayed for several months.

In addition, there was a smaller fire reported at the reception area of Tamweel Tower in the U cluster. The only reported injury was an infant who was taken to the hospital to be treated for minor smoke inhalation.

The Dubai Police forensic department released its findings on the fire, which burnt half the building in the early hours of November 18, 2012. According to the report, the fire started at the back of the building on the ground floor, where the waste material was piled by the laborers working on a shop in the building. The waste material contained papers, tape and wood which fueled the flame.

JLT includes the Al Seef Towers, a group of three apartment buildings. One of these, the Tamweel Tower, was gutted by fire in November 2012. The tower was repaired by the end of 2016.

On April 22, 2018, a fire broke out in Almas Tower and all residents were evacuated, no reported injuries according to Dubai Civil Defence.

Reviews 
Jumeirah Lake Towers has become a popular mixed-use communities, said Ahmed Bin Sulayem, Executive Chairman and Chief Executive Officer of DMCC.

See also
 Dubai Multi Commodities Centre
 Jumeirah Lakes Towers Free Zone
 Dubai Ports World
 Almas Tower
 Armada Towers

References

External links

 

Communities in Dubai
Planned communities